Sarnecki (feminine Sarnecka) is a Polish surname. Notable people with the surname include:

Jerzy Sarnecki (born 1947), Polish-Swedish criminologist
Rafał Sarnecki (born 1990), Polish racing cyclist

Polish-language surnames